Connor James (born 17 July 1996) is a Canadian former professional soccer player who played as a goalkeeper for FC Edmonton.

Club career

FC Edmonton
On 3 May 2014, James appeared on the bench for FC Edmonton in an NASL match against Fort Lauderdale Strikers. He would make another bench appearance that season in a Canadian Championship match against Montreal Impact.

Edmonton Green & Gold
From 2014 to 2019, James attended the University of Alberta, where he would make 67 appearances over five seasons for the Golden Bears.

While attending university, James played for the Edmonton Green & Gold in the Alberta Major Soccer League, making a total of 23 appearances between 2016 and 2018.

Return to FC Edmonton
In November 2018, James was selected in the first round of the CPL–U Sports Draft, seventh overall, by his former club FC Edmonton. On 17 January 2019, James officially signed with FC Edmonton. On 4 May 2019, James made his professional debut against Valour FC in the club's first match in the Canadian Premier League. That season, he made a total of 22 league appearances, and was one of the three goalkeepers nominated for the CPL Golden Glove. On 27 November 2019, James re-signed with Edmonton for the 2020 season. He once again signed another contract to keep him with Edmonton for the 2021 season on January 11, 2021. He announced his retirement following the conclusion of the 2021 season.

Overall, James made 52 appearances for FC Edmonton, remaining as the club's number one goalkeeper for its first three years in the CPL, and collected twelve clean sheets. While these seasons were not successful for the Eddies, as they finished at or near the bottom of the table each time, James was often a bright spot, as seen from his 2019 Golden Glove nomination.

References

External links

1996 births
Living people
Association football goalkeepers
Canadian soccer players
Soccer players from Edmonton
FC Edmonton players
Alberta Golden Bears players
North American Soccer League players
Canadian Premier League players
University and college soccer players in Canada